Rušinov is a municipality and village in Havlíčkův Brod District in the Vysočina Region of the Czech Republic. It has about 200 inhabitants.

Administrative parts
Villages and hamlets of Hostětínky, Modletín and Vratkov are administrative parts of Rušinov.

References

Villages in Havlíčkův Brod District